Halema or Halimeh Boland (born 10 December 1975) is a Kuwaiti television presenter in the Arab World and former fashion model She was awarded "Miss Arab Journalist" in 2007.

Career

In 2009 during the month of Ramadan, Halema, in conjunction with station MBC, starred in the "Series Halema". It was a quiz program and garnered a large viewership. It was described as controversial, which was written about extensively in the press.

Boland joined the "funoon-tv" channel in 2011.

Personal life
She is married to her colleague at the university, Abdul-Salam Al-Khubaizi.

References

External links

 

Kuwait University alumni
Kuwaiti female models
Kuwaiti people of Iranian descent
Living people
1980 births